Ruan Yang (Chinese: 阮杨; born 13 December 1993 in Hangzhou, China) is a Chinese footballer who plays as a left-footed right winger for Kunshan FC.

Club career
Ruan Yang started his football career when he joined Hangzhou Greentown's youth academy in 2008. After joining the academy, he was sent to the clubs reserve team Wenzhou Provenza F.C. who were allowed to play in the Chinese football pyramid before being one of the players in the football star project and went to Portugal for football training in 2011. He arrived in Portugal on 16 December 2011, he played for Real SC's youth team alongside Li Yuanyi in the 2011-12 season. In the summer of 2012, he trained with Sporting CP B and signed a contract to play for the team. Ruan made his first appearance for Sporting CP B on 6 December 2012, coming on as a substitute in a 2-3 loss against Uniao Madeira. In the winter of 2013, he was loaned to low tier club Amora. He played three games and scored one goal before he returned to China in March 2013. Ruan then signed with Chinese Super League side Hangzhou Greentown on 1 July 2013.

At Hangzhou, Ruan would struggle to gain much playing time and was even dropped to the reserves before he transferred to League Two side Hunan Billows on 9 March 2018. He would transfer to another third tier club in Kunshan FC and be part of the team that gained promotion to the second tier at the end of the 2019 China League Two campaign. He would go on to establish himself as regular within the team and was part of the squad that won the division and promotion to the top tier at the end of the 2022 China League One campaign.

Career statistics
.

Honours

Club 
Kunshan
 China League One: 2022

References

External links
 

1993 births
Living people
Chinese footballers
Sportspeople from Hangzhou
Footballers from Zhejiang
Zhejiang Professional F.C. players
Hunan Billows players
Kunshan F.C. players
Chinese expatriate footballers
Chinese Super League players
China League One players
China League Two players
Liga Portugal 2 players
Expatriate footballers in Portugal
Chinese expatriate sportspeople in Portugal
Association football wingers